Patrick Müller may refer to:
 Patrick Müller (footballer) (born 1976), Swiss footballer
 Patrick Müller (cyclist) (born 1996), Swiss cyclist
 Patrick Müller (shot putter) (born 1996), German shot putter